Coire may refer to:

Geography
 Cirque, a terrain feature created by glaciation in high mountains
 Chur, a town in Switzerland